The Battle of Sunday may refer to:

 the Battle of Sunday (AD 870s) between Rhodri the Great and Saxons (probably from Mercia) on Anglesey
 the Battle of Palm Sunday (1429) between Clan Cameron and the Chattan Confederation in the Scottish Highlands
 the Easter Sunday Raid (1942) between the Imperial Japanese and British navies off Ceylon (modern Sri Lanka)